Bala Ahmed Garba (born 9 August 1974 in Lagos) is a Nigerian footballer and coach. He played for FK Haugesund from 1997 to 2002, scoring 61 goals, which is a club record. In the 2005 season he played for Start, winning silver medal in the Tippeliga with the club. In 2006, he played for Notodden Fotballklubb. Later he settled in Kopervik, where he has been coaching local clubs in addition to daytime work.

Career statistics

References 

1974 births
Living people
Nigerian footballers
El-Kanemi Warriors F.C. players
FK Haugesund players
GIF Sundsvall players
IK Start players
Notodden FK players
Allsvenskan players
Eliteserien players
Norwegian First Division players
Nigerian expatriate footballers
Expatriate footballers in Norway
Expatriate footballers in Sweden
Nigerian expatriate sportspeople in Sweden
Nigerian expatriate sportspeople in Norway
Association football forwards